Nuvo L'esprit De Paris is a fortified wine marketed as a sparkling liqueur. Nuvo is made in Paris, France and imported by the London Group. Nuvo was initially marketed to women; early bottles displayed the words "For Her". Later the company removed the "For Her" print.

Production 
The Nuvo bottle looks like a large perfume bottle. Nuvo is made with grain and spring water and then mixed with sparkling wine.

See also 
Fortified wine
Low-end fortified wine
Malt Liquor

References

External links 
 sparklingnuvo.com
 Nuvo Myspace 
 Vodka bottle's look spurs insults, gunfire at West Side party

French liqueurs